Joseph Wilson McEwan (16 April 1830 – 26 February 1885), was an Australian cricket player, who played one first-class cricket match for Tasmania on 29 and 30 March 1852. He made 10 not out.

References

External links

1830 births
1885 deaths
Australian cricketers
Tasmania cricketers
Scottish emigrants to Australia